The 1978 New York Jets season was the nineteenth season for the franchise and the ninth in the National Football League. It began with the team trying to improve upon its 3–11 record from each of the previous three seasons under head coach Walt Michaels. Following an opening-game upset over the Miami Dolphins at Shea Stadium, the Jets stayed in contention for most of the season before finishing with an 8–8 record, with Matt Robinson starting most of the season at quarterback.

Offseason 

The Jets overhauled their uniforms and logos for the 1978 season, abandoning the jerseys they had worn since 1963 and the helmet and logo they’d used since 1965 in favor of a more modern look using the same kelly-green-and-white color scheme. The new helmets were solid green with white facemasks, and a stylized “JETS” wordmark in white on each side. The mark featured angular lettering and a silhouette of a modern jet airplane extending horizontally to the right from the top of the “J” above the “ETS”. The jerseys featured large TV numerals on the shoulders and two thick parallel stripes on the sleeves, while the pants had a single green stripe from hip to knee on each side.

NFL Draft

Personnel

Staff

Roster

Regular season

Schedule

Game summaries

Week 1

Week 2

Week 3

Week 4

Week 5

Week 6

Week 7

Week 8 
Television Network: CBS
Announcers: Don Criqui, Nick Buoniconti and Sonny Jurgensen
Pat Leahy kicked three field goals and Scott Dierking scored a pair of touchdowns as the Jets are still in the hunt for a wild card berth. Leahy who entered the game with an NFL leading 55 points connected on kicks of 20, 38 and 45 yards, the last two in a 13-point third quarter that broke a 10-10 halftime tie. Dierking, who had only one pro touchdowns in his first two seasons, punched over from the 2-yard line and went in from the 11. For the day, Dierking gained 94 yards.

Week 9

Week 10

Week 11

Week 12

Week 13

Week 14

Week 15

Week 16

Standings

Awards and records 
 Wesley Walker, NFL Leader in Receiving Yards, (1,169)

References

External links 
 1978 statistics

New York Jets seasons
New York Jets
New York Jets season
1970s in Queens